Ersatz capitalism may refer to:

 Ersatz capitalism (Southeast Asia), an analysis by Kunio Yoshihara of the early rising economies of East Asia
 Lemon socialism, in the usage of Joseph Stiglitz